The Mirror is a 1997 Iranian film directed by Jafar Panahi, about a little girl trying to find her way home from school.

Plot
Mina, a first-grader, finds her mother has failed to pick her up from school. The movie is about her endeavor to find her way home amidst the noise, confusion and chaos of Tehran. Mina is dressed in school uniform (with a head scarf), has one arm in a cast and is holding a school bag in the other. She meets a lot of people on her way and most of them try to help her while others are surprisingly apathetic to her situation. Eventually, the movie takes a turn when the girl looks into the camera for the first time, breaking the fourth wall, and someone shouts from off-screen, "Mina, don't look into the camera!" The movie is a real-life capture of events thereon (or that is how it seems). Mina announces that she doesn't want to act in the movie any more and wants to go home. In the end she goes home after returning the microphone.

Meaning 
In a 2006 interview, Panahi said that the film was meant to show how "reality and the imagination are intertwined, they are very similar". Also he mentioned about how the film is staged in a way which normally nobody would suspect was drama but would instead believe was real.

Cast
 Mina Mohammad Khani — Mina
 Kazem Mojdehi
 Naser Omuni
 M. Shirzad
 T. Samadpour

Accolades

References

External links

1997 films
1997 drama films
Iranian drama films
1990s Persian-language films
Films directed by Jafar Panahi
Golden Leopard winners